"Hyperactive" is a song by the English vocalist Robert Palmer, which was released in 1986 as the fourth single from his eighth studio album Riptide. The song was written by Dennis Nelson, Tony Haynes and Palmer, and produced by Bernard Edwards. Released as the follow-up to his US chart topper "Addicted to Love", "Hyperactive" reached No. 33 on the Billboard Hot 100 and was the first time Palmer had scored two consecutive top 40 hits from an album. It remained on the charts for twelve weeks.

Release
"Hyperactive" was released by Island Records on 7" vinyl in the US, Europe, Australia, New Zealand and Japan. A 12" vinyl version was released in Europe, with a promotional-only version also issued in the US. For its release as a single, "Hyperactive" was edited to reduce its duration. The B-side, "Woke Up Laughing", had originally appeared on Palmer's 1980 album Clues.

Critical reception
Upon release, Cash Box commented: "An aggressive, tough-edged rhythm track [which] should capitalize on Palmer's newfound star status. Danceable and featuring his characteristic soulish vocal, "Hyperactive" has tons of radio appeal." In a retrospective review of Riptide, Tim DiGravina of AllMusic noted how the album was made up of "mostly rocking songs", with "Hyperactive" "add[ing] a bit of a pop veneer to the formula, with its bright keyboards dating the song to the Miami Vice era; that's not to say it doesn't hold nostalgic charm."

Track listing
7" single
"Hyperactive (Edit)" - 3:35
"Woke Up Laughing" - 3:36

7" single (US promo)
"Hyperactive (Edit)" - 3:35
"Hyperactive (Edit)" - 3:35

12" single (European release)
"Hyperactive" - 5:05
"Hyperactive (Edit)" - 3:35
"Woke Up Laughing" - 3:36

12" single (US promo)
"Hyperactive (Vocal LP Version)" - 5:08
"Hyperactive (Vocal LP Version)" - 5:08

Personnel
 Robert Palmer - vocals
 Bernard Edwards - producer, bass
 Eddie Martinez - guitar
 Tony Thompson - drums
 Jason Corsaro - engineer
 Eric Thorngren - mixing
 Jack Skinner - mastering

Chart performance

References

1985 songs
1986 singles
Island Records singles
Robert Palmer (singer) songs
Songs written by Robert Palmer (singer)
Songs written by Tony Haynes
Song recordings produced by Bernard Edwards